Mike Parenti (born 13 March 2000) is a French professional rugby league footballer who plays as a er for the Catalans Dragons in the Betfred Super League.

In 2022, he made his Catalans debut in the Super League against the Wigan Warriors.

References

External links
Catalans Dragons profile

2000 births
Living people
Catalans Dragons players
French rugby league players
Rugby league wingers